Conwal Cemetery is a burial ground on the outskirts of Letterkenny in County Donegal. It serves the parish of Conwal and Leck. The Forglug Burn flows along the western boundary of the cemetery, flowing into the River Swilly a short distance to the south of the cemetery.

Notable burials
 Liam Adams (high-profile brother of Gerry Adams, who attended the funeral)
 James Duffy (VC)
 John Hannigan
 Manus Kelly
 Dessie Larkin
 Bernard McGlinchey
 Joe 'Dodo' Winston

References

External links
 

Cemeteries in County Donegal
Cemetery